Dendropupoidea is an extinct superfamily of fossil land snails in the clade Caenogastropoda.

Taxonomy
Families within the superfamily Dendropupoidea include:
 † Family Dendropupidae
 † Family Anthracopupidae

References